Maqsudlu-ye Olya (also Romanized as Maqşūdlū-ye ‘Olyā; also known as Maqşūdlū-ye Bālā) is a village in Aslan Duz Rural District, Aslan Duz District, Parsabad County, Ardabil Province, Iran. At the 2006 census, its population was 496, in 98 families.

References 

Tageo

Towns and villages in Parsabad County